Chris and His Wonderful Lamp is a 1917 American silent fantasy film directed by Alan Crosland and starring Joseph Burke, Claire Adams and William Wadsworth.

Cast
 Joseph Burke as Professor Cipher 
 Thomas Carnahan Jr. as Chris 
 William Wadsworth as The Genie 
 Rolinda Bainbridge as Hulda 
 P.J. Rollow as Mr. Wagstaff 
 Nellie Grant as Mrs. Wagstaff 
 Shirley Braithwaite as Doctor 
 Victor McManus as Spud Ramsey 
 Joe Blaize as The Dragon 
 Claire Adams as Betty 
 George D. Melville as Auctioneer

References

Bibliography
 Rémi Fournier Lanzoni. French Cinema: From Its Beginnings to the Present. A&C Black, 2004.

External links

1917 films
1910s fantasy films
American fantasy films
Films directed by Alan Crosland
American silent feature films
American black-and-white films
Edison Studios films
1910s English-language films
1910s American films